Baptiste Mouazan (born 27 September 2001) is a French professional footballer who plays as a midfielder for  club Nancy.

Career
A youth product of Rennes, CPB Bréquigny, and Lorient, Mouazan began his senior career with the reserves of Lorient. He signed his first professional contract with the club on 7 July 2021. He made his professional debut with Lorient in a 4–0 Ligue 1 tie with Strasbourg on 31 October 2021, coming on as a late sub in the 77th minute

On 28 June 2022, Mouazan signed a three-year deal with Nancy.

References

External links
 
 

2001 births
Living people
Footballers from Rennes
French footballers
Association football midfielders
FC Lorient players
AS Nancy Lorraine players
Ligue 1 players
Championnat National 2 players